This List of Mountains in Georgia names the highest mountains in Georgia, country in the western part of the Caucasus. Georgia has 2672 prominent peaks. The highest peak in the country is the Shchara, at 5193  meters one of the country's three five-thousanders. The highest peaks in the country are in the Greater Caucasus. Another remarkable mountain is the Mtatsminda in the capital Tbilisi.

See also 
 List of highest mountains

References 

Georgia
Mountains
Georgia
Georgia